The 2014 F1600 Championship Series season was the fourth season of the F1600 Championship Series. The season commenced on April 12 at Road Atlanta, and ended on October 12 at Watkins Glen International after 14 races held at 7 meetings.

No fewer than eleven drivers won races during the season, but it was Norway's Ayla Ågren who won the title for Team Pelfrey. Ågren had trailed her team-mate Garth Rickards by nine points going into the final round, but her last-lap victory in the final race of the season; her third win of 2014 – passing Sam Chastain to do so – allowed her to take the championship title, ahead of Rickards by a total of thirteen points. Team Pelfrey swept the top three placings in the final championship standings, as Augie Lerch managed to surpass Jack Mitchell, Jr. by eleven points, again with results in the final race of the season. The only other driver to win multiple races during the season was James Goughary, who won races at the first Watkins Glen meeting as well as Road Atlanta, en route to finishing fifth overall in the championship and as the best placed Masters class driver. Rickards, Chastain, Lerch and Mitchell all won a race each, while other drivers to win were Franklin Futrelle at Road Atlanta, Mikhail Goikhberg at the first Watkins Glen meeting, Brandon Newey and Steve Bamford at Virginia International Raceway, as well as Evan Mehan at Thompson Speedway Motorsports Park.

Drivers and teams

Race calendar and results

Final points standings

(M) Indicates Masters class driver

References

External links
 

F1600 Championship
F1600 Championship Series seasons